Nikita Andreyevich Glushkov (born 23 June 1994) is a Russian football player. He plays as a left winger for Yenisey Krasnoyarsk.

Club career
He made his debut in the Russian Football National League for Sibir Novosibirsk on 11 July 2016 in a game against Spartak Moscow 2.

On 28 December 2016, he signed a contract with the Russian Premier League side Ural Yekaterinburg. He made his Russian Premier League debut for Ural on 29 April 2017 in a game against Terek Grozny.

On 29 December 2018, he joined Baltika Kaliningrad on loan until the end of the 2018–19 season. On 18 June 2019, he rejoined Baltika on a season-long loan.

Career statistics

Club

References

External links
 Profile by Russian Football National League

1994 births
Sportspeople from Kirov, Kirov Oblast
Living people
Russian footballers
Association football midfielders
FC Dynamo Kirov players
FK Slavoj Trebišov players
FC Khimki players
FC Sibir Novosibirsk players
FC Ural Yekaterinburg players
FC Baltika Kaliningrad players
FC Yenisey Krasnoyarsk players
Russian Premier League players
Russian First League players
Russian Second League players
2. Liga (Slovakia) players
Russian expatriate footballers
Expatriate footballers in Slovakia
Russian expatriate sportspeople in Slovakia